Adelaide Provincial Hospital is a provincial government-funded hospital for the Nxuba Local Municipality area in Adelaide, Eastern Cape in South Africa. It used to be a (private) Provincially Aided Hospital.

The hospital departments include Emergency department, Paediatric ward, Gynecology and Maternity ward, Out Patients Department, Surgical Services, Medical Services, Operating Theatre & Central Sterile Services Department Services, Pharmacy, Anti-Retroviral (ARV) treatment for HIV/AIDS, Post Trauma Counseling Services, X-ray Services, Laundry Services, Kitchen Services and Mortuary.

References
 Eastern Cape Department of Health website - Amathole District Hospitals

Hospitals in the Eastern Cape
Raymond Mhlaba Local Municipality